Flipse is a surname of Dutch origin. Notable people with the surname include:

Eduard Flipse (1896–1973), Dutch conductor and composer
Eline Flipse (born 1954), Dutch documentary filmmaker

References

Surnames of Dutch origin